Megan Cardwell Godfrey (born December 5, 1983) is an American educator and politician serving in the Arkansas House of Representatives from the 89th district. She is a member of the Democratic Party.

Early life
Megan Cardwell was born to parents Cindy and Gary Cardwell on December 5, 1983. The family moved to Springdale, Arkansas when she was 14. After graduating from Springdale High School, Cardwell attended the University of Arkansas in Fayetteville, graduating with a major in Spanish and minor in Latin American studies. She was active in Associated Student Government and was named homecoming queen at the University of Arkansas in 2004.

Career
Cardwell joined Teach for America after graduation and taught in the Los Angeles Unified School District until 2008. During this time, she also earned a master's in early childhood education from Loyola Marymount University.

In 2008, Cardwell married Daniel Godfrey of Springdale and returned to Springdale to raise her family. She worked at Springdale Public Schools as a teacher and ESL curriculum specialist. Springdale is the largest school district in Arkansas and often has the highest proportion of ESL-students in the state, reflecting the diverse demographics of Springdale and the 89th district. After nine years in Springdale, Godfrey took a position with Fayetteville Public Schools as Co-Director of English Language Learning.

Politics

In the general election on November 6, 2018, Godfrey narrowly unseated Republican State Rep. Jeff Williams by a final vote of 1,857 to 1,827 (50.5%-49.5%). She was the first Democrat elected to the House from Springdale since Louis McJunkin, who retired in 1999.

As a member of the 92nd Arkansas General Assembly, Godfrey was in the minority as a Democrat. At the start of the session, Republicans had maintained a state government trifecta since 2015. Godfrey's signature legislation in 2019 was lead sponsor of Act 837, which grants nursing licenses to qualified nursing school students with a Deferred Action for Childhood Arrivals (DACA) status.

She announced plans to run for reelection in June 2019. Unopposed in the Democratic primary, Godfrey won a second term in November 2020 against Republican challenger Jed Duggar, a son of former state representative Jim Bob Duggar of 19 Kids and Counting fame.

See also

References

1983 births
Living people
Democratic Party members of the Arkansas House of Representatives
People from Springdale, Arkansas
Women state legislators in Arkansas
21st-century American politicians
21st-century American women politicians
Teach For America alumni